Andrés Gómez was the defending champion, but lost in the quarterfinals to Aaron Krickstein.

Andre Agassi won the title by defeating Slobodan Živojinović 7–5, 7–6(7–2), 7–5 in the final.

Seeds

Draw

Finals

Top half

Section 1

Section 2

Bottom half

Section 3

Section 4

References

External links
 Official results archive (ATP)
 Official results archive (ITF)

1988
1988 Grand Prix (tennis)